The  was the head of the Daijō-kan (Great Council of State) during and after the Nara period and briefly under the Meiji Constitution. Equivalent to the Chinese  (Grand Preceptor).

History  
Emperor Tenji's favorite son, Prince Ōtomo, was the first to have been accorded the title of Daijō-daijin during the reign of his father. The Asuka Kiyomihara Code of 689 marks the initial appearance of the Daijō Daijin in the context of a central administrative body composed of the three ministers: the Daijō-daijin (Chancellor), the Sadaijin (Minister of the Left), and the Udaijin (Minister of the Right). These positions were consolidated under the Code of Taihō in 702.

As the Fujiwara clan—which dominated the regency—gained influence, the official government offices diminished in power. By the 10th century, chancellors had no power to speak of unless they were simultaneously regent, or otherwise supported by the Fujiwara. Although the position continued in name until 1885, by the beginning of the 12th century, the office was essentially powerless, and was often vacant for lengthy periods. Substantial administrative power over the government was in other hands.

This prominent office was briefly resurrected under the Meiji Constitution with the appointment of Sanjō Sanetomi in 1871, before being abolished completely in 1885 in favor of the newly created office of Prime Minister.

Functions 
The Chancellor presided over the Great Council of State, and controlled the officers of the state, in particular the Sadaijin and Udaijin, as well as four great councillors and three minor councillors. The ministers in turn controlled other elements of the government.

List of the Chancellors of the Realm

See also
 Kugyō
 Sesshō and Kampaku
 Kōkyū
 Kuge
 Imperial Household Agency

Notes

References

  Asai, T. (1985). Nyokan Tūkai. Tokyo: Kōdansha.
 Dickenson, Walter G. (1869). Japan: Being a Sketch of the History, Government and Officers of the Empire. London: W. Blackwood and Sons. 
 Ozaki, Yukio. (2001). The Autobiography of Ozaki Yukio: The Struggle for Constitutional Government in Japan. [Translated by Fujiko Hara]. Princeton: Princeton University Press.  (cloth)
  Ozaki, Yukio. (1955). Ozak Gakudō Zenshū. Tokyo: Kōronsha.
 Hall, John Whitney, Delmer M. Brown and Kozo Yamamura. (1993).  The Cambridge History of Japan. Cambridge: Cambridge University Press. 
 Ponsonby-Fane, Richard Arthur Brabazon. (1959).  The Imperial House of Japan. Kyoto: Ponsonby Memorial Society. OCLC 194887
 Sansom, George (1958). A History of Japan to 1334. Stanford: Stanford University Press.
 Screech, Timon. (2006). Secret Memoirs of the Shoguns:  Isaac Titsingh and Japan, 1779-1822. London: Routledge Curzon.  
  Titsingh, Isaac, ed. (1834). [Siyun-sai Rin-siyo/Hayashi Gahō, 1652], Nipon o daï itsi ran; ou, [https://books.google.com/books?id=18oNAAAAIAAJ&dq=nipon+o+dai+itsi+ran  Annales des empereurs du Japon.]  Paris: Oriental Translation Fund of Great Britain and Ireland.
 Varley, H. Paul , ed. (1980). [ Kitabatake Chikafusa, 1359], Jinnō Shōtōki ("A Chronicle of Gods and Sovereigns: Jinnō Shōtōki of Kitabatake Chikafusa" translated by H. Paul Varley). New York: Columbia University Press.  

Government of feudal Japan
Meiji Restoration
 
Japanese courtiers